The 2022 South Korean Figure Skating Championships were held from January 7–9, 2022 at the Uijeongbu Indoor Ice Rink in Uijeongbu. It was the 76th edition of the event. Medals were awarded in the disciplines of men's singles, women's singles, and ice dance on the senior and junior levels. The results will be part of the Korean Skating Union's selection criteria for the 2022 Winter Olympics and the 2022 World Championships.

Due to the COVID-19 pandemic in South Korea, no spectators were allowed at the event.

Schedule

Medal summary

Senior

Junior

Entries 
A list of preliminary entries was published on December 27, 2021.

Senior

Junior

Senior results

Senior men

Senior women

Senior ice dance 
Yura Min / Daniel Eaton, the only senior Korean ice dance team, did not travel to Korea from their Novi, Michigan, United States training base.

Junior results

Junior men

Junior women 

* Jeon Seo-yeong finished at a higher place due to a better program component score.

Junior ice dance

International team selections

Winter Universiade
The 2021 Winter Universiade, originally scheduled for January 21–31, 2021 in Lucerne, Switzerland, was postponed to December 11–21, 2021, before eventually being cancelled definitively on November 29, 2021. Athletes were selected at an internal competition prior to the South Korean Championships, before the event was cancelled.

Four Continents Championships 
The 2022 Four Continents Championships will be held in Tallinn, Estonia from January 18–23, 2022. Athletes were selected at an internal competition prior to the South Korean Championships.

Winter Olympics 
The 2022 Winter Olympics will be held in Beijing, China from February 4–20, 2022.

World Junior Championships 
Commonly referred to as "Junior Worlds", the 2022 World Junior Championships will be held in Sofia, Bulgaria from March 7–13, 2022.

World Championships 
The 2022 World Championships will be held in Montpellier, France from March 21–27, 2022.

References

External links 
 

South Korean Figure Skating Championships
South Korean Figure Skating Championships, 2022
Figure skating
January 2022 sports events in South Korea